The 1895 Boston College football team was an American football team that represented Boston College as an independent during the 1895 college football season. Led by Joseph Lawless in his first and only season as head coach, Boston College compiled a record of 2–4–2.

Schedule

References

Boston College
Boston College Eagles football seasons
Boston College football
19th century in Boston